The 1992 Philippine Basketball Association (PBA) rookie draft was an event at which teams drafted players from the amateur ranks. The annual rookie draft was held on January 12, 1992, at The ULTRA.

Round 1

Round 2

Round 3

Round 4

Notes
 Alaska, the only team with two options in the first round, acquired the rights on the seventh pick overall by trading Eric Altamirano to Pepsi Cola in 1991.
 The ballclubs have to sign their draftees within five days otherwise the players become free agents.

References

Philippine Basketball Association draft
draft